Liam Donnelly may refer to:

 Liam Donnelly (hurler) (born 1928), Dublin hurler
 Liam Donnelly (footballer) (born 1996), Northern Irish footballer